SSSI can mean:
Solid state storage initiative, a network promoting the use of solid state storage
Site of Special Scientific Interest, a UK nature conservation designation
Site of Special Scientific Interest (Hong Kong), a Hong Kong nature conservation designation
Skin and skin structure infection, a bacterial infection of the skin
Stainless Steel Studios, a video games company
"Special Secret Song Inside", a track from the Red Hot Chili Peppers album The Uplift Mofo Party Plan
 Surveying and Spatial Sciences Institute